Luís Caetano Pereira Guimarães Júnior (17 February 1845, in Rio de Janeiro – 20 May 1898, in Lisbon) was a Brazilian diplomat, poet, novelist and dramaturgist. 

He was bachelor in the Faculdade de Direito do Recife in 1869, in the same class of the writer Araripe Júnior. His works switched from Romanticism to Parnasianism. 

As a diplomat, he lived in Santiago de Chile, Roma and Lisbon, where he finally stayed and he met intellectuals such as Eça de Queiroz, Ramalho Ortigão, Guerra Junqueiro or Fialho de Almeida. He was a member and one of the founders of Academia Brasileira de Letras.

Works
Lírio branco, novel (1862);
Uma cena contemporânea, theatre (1862);
 Corimbos, poesia (1866);
 A família agulha, novel (1870);
 Noturnos, poetry (1872);
 Filigranas, fiction (1872);
 Sonetos e rimas, poetry (1880);
 As quedas fatais, theatre;
 André Vidal, theatre;
 As jóias indiscretas, theatre;
 Um pequeno demônio, theatre;
 O caminho mais curto, theatre;
 Os amores que passam, theatre;
 Valentina, theatre;
 A alma do outro mundo, theatre (1913).

1845 births
1898 deaths
Brazilian male writers
Members of the Brazilian Academy of Letters